Lieutenant-Colonel Charles Edward Bruce  (23 March 1876 – 26 January 1950) was a British Indian Army officer and British colonial administrator. He served as the Chief Commissioner of Baluchistan in the 1920s.

Biography
Bruce was born in India, the son of Richard Isaac Bruce  of the Indian Civil Service. He was educated in England at Wellington College and the Royal Military College, Sandhurst. From Sandhurst, he was commissioned into the Lancashire Fusiliers and within the year was transferred to the 24th Baluchistan Regiment. He took part in the Boxer Rebellion in China and also some frontier wars of the North-Western Frontier.

Bruce then joined the Political Department, where he became a devoted follower of the policies of Sir Robert Groves Sandeman. As noted by The Times: "[Bruce] became so deeply attracted by its success that he held it to be applicable to the tribes of quite different calibre in the Frontier regions invisibly divided by the Durand Line. He was proud to be called to act as Chief Commissioner of Baluchistan in 1930. He retired in 1931 and when opportunity offered he spoke in advocacy of Sandemanization."

Honours
Bruce was appointed an Officer of the Order of the British Empire in the 1919 New Year Honours, when he was serving as a political officer with Marri Punitive Force, Baluchistan. He was appointed a Companion of the Order of the Indian Empire in the 1920 New Year Honours for services in India involving the Third Anglo-Afghan War. Third Anglo-Afghan War

He was appointed a Commander of the Order of the British Empire in the 1925 Birthday Honours. He was appointed a Companion of the Order of the Star of India in 1929.

References

Chief Commissioners of Baluchistan
1950 deaths
1876 births
British military personnel of the Boxer Rebellion
Commanders of the Order of the British Empire
Companions of the Order of the Indian Empire
Companions of the Order of the Star of India
People from Finchampstead
British Indian Army officers
Lancashire Fusiliers officers
People educated at Wellington College, Berkshire
Graduates of the Royal Military College, Sandhurst
Military personnel of British India
British people in colonial India